Northfield is a hamlet in Delaware County, New York. It is located northwest of Walton at the corner of White Hill Road and Loomis Brook Road. Kerrs Creek flows southeast through the hamlet. Teed Pond is located west and Loomis Mountain is located south-southwest of the hamlet.

References

Geography of Delaware County, New York
Hamlets in Delaware County, New York
Hamlets in New York (state)